In mathematics, the Gelfond–Schneider theorem establishes the transcendence of a large class of numbers.

History

It was originally proved independently in 1934 by Aleksandr Gelfond and Theodor Schneider.

Statement

 If a and b are complex algebraic numbers with a ≠ 0, 1, and b not rational, then any value of ab is a transcendental number.

Comments

 The values of a and b are not restricted to real numbers; complex numbers are allowed (here complex numbers are not regarded as rational when they have an imaginary part not equal to 0, even if both the real and imaginary parts are rational).
 In general,  is multivalued, where ln stands for the natural logarithm. This accounts for the phrase "any value of" in the theorem's statement.
 An equivalent formulation of the theorem is the following: if α and γ are nonzero algebraic numbers, and we take any non-zero logarithm of α, then  is either rational or transcendental.  This may be expressed as saying that if ,  are linearly independent over the rationals, then they are linearly independent over the algebraic numbers.  The generalisation of this statement to more general linear forms in logarithms of several algebraic numbers is in the domain of transcendental number theory.
 If the restriction that a and b be algebraic is removed, the statement does not remain true in general. For example,

A characterization of the values for a and b which yield a transcendental ab is not known.
 Kurt Mahler proved the p-adic analogue of the theorem: if a and b are in Cp, the completion of the algebraic closure of Qp, and they are algebraic over Q, and if  and  then  is either rational or transcendental, where logp is the p-adic logarithm function.

Corollaries
The transcendence of the following numbers follows immediately from the theorem:

 Gelfond–Schneider constant  and its square root 
 Gelfond's constant

Applications

The Gelfond–Schneider theorem answers affirmatively Hilbert's seventh problem.

See also
 Lindemann–Weierstrass theorem
 Baker's theorem; an extension of the result
 Schanuel's conjecture; if proven it would imply both the Gelfond–Schneider theorem and the Lindemann–Weierstrass theorem

References

Further reading

External links
A proof of the Gelfond–Schneider theorem

Transcendental numbers
Theorems in number theory